Abkhazian Dze (Ӡ ӡ; italics: Ӡ ӡ) is a letter of the Cyrillic script. It is used in the Abkhazian language where it represents the voiced alveolar affricate , pronounced like  in "pods".

This letter was also used in one 1937 proposal (not adopted) for the Karelian language.

The letter looks very similar in shape to Latin Ezh (Ʒ, ʒ), but the uppercase form of the Abkhazian Dze has no descender or has a shortened tail.

Computing codes

See also
Ʒ ʒ : Latin letter Ezh
S s : Cyrillic letter Dze (Macedonian Dze)
Cyrillic characters in Unicode

References